Jeffrey Alexandre Rousseau (December 22, 1852 – June 22, 1927) was a Canadian politician.

The son of Alexandre Rousseau and Marie Proteau, Rousseau was elected to the House of Commons of Canada for the Quebec electoral district of Champlain in the 1900 federal election. A Liberal, he was re-elected in the 1904 election and was defeated in the 1911 election.

Rousseau was a merchant, farmer, manufacturer and banker. He served as mayor of Sainte-Anne-de-la-Pérade from 1890 to 1896 and from 1904 to 1905. He was married twice: to Hélène-Catherine Hamelin in 1882 and to Corinne Dufresne in 1886.

Rousseau served in the militia during the Fenian raids and later served as lieutenant-colonel for the 4th Regiment of the Chasseurs Canadiens.

References
Source
 
Notes

1852 births
1927 deaths
Liberal Party of Canada MPs
Members of the House of Commons of Canada from Quebec
Mayors of places in Quebec
People of the Fenian raids